Mouloud Feraoun (8 March 1913 – 15 March 1962) was an Algerian writer and martyr of the Algerian revolution born in Tizi Hibel, Kabylie. Some of his books, written in French, have been translated into several languages including English and German. In 1951, he corresponded with the Algeria-born French author Albert Camus. He was kidnapped and assassinated by the French OAS on 15 March 1962.

All of his works describe Feraoun's native society – the Berber mountain farmers – and their life, poverty, the love of one's homeland, emigration, and the consequences of French colonialism.

On 3 March 2022, in a ceremony in Algiers, French president Emmanuel Macron honored Feraoun and other victims of the OAS.

Biography 
Feraoun was born in 1913, belonging to a family of poor farmers. His father, who was illiterate, had to migrate several times to seek employment, for example to Tunisia and even to northern France, where he worked in the coal mines of the Nord departement. There, Feraoun's father suffered an injury, which found a literary treatment in his first novel Fils du Pauvre.

In a time where very few of the Muslim children of Algeria went to school, Feraoun studied at the Ecole normale in Bouzaréah District in order to qualify as a teacher, and in 1935, he began to teach in his own birthplace. Later, from 1957, Feraoun was a school director in Algiers, and in 1960, he was made an inspector who supervised social institutions that cared for disadvantaged Algerians.

On 15 March, 1962, together with five of his colleagues, he was assassinated by the OAS, just four days before the end of the Algerian War.

Family tragedy in 2022 
Feraoun's twin granddaughters, Nasrine and Narjisse, died in a widely publicised tragedy that occurred in Montreux, Switzerland, after the police called to their apartment to serve a warrant that involved compulsory school attendance on 24 March 2022. The family – Feraoun's two granddaughters, the husband of one of them, and two of their children – jumped from the seventh floor balcony. The only survivor is Feraoun's 15 year old great-grandson, who suffered serious injuries. The family was described as extremely reclusive.

References

Bibliography 
 Le Fils du pauvre (The Poor Man's Son) - 1950
 La terre et le sang (Earth and Blood) - 1953
 Jours de Kabylie (Days of Kabylie) - 1954
 Les Chemins qui montent (The Paths that Rise) - 1957
 Les Isefra de Si Mhand Oumhand (Verses of  Si Mhand Oumhand), 1960
 Journal, 1955 - 1962
 Lettres à ses amis (Letter to his friends), 1969 (posthumous)
 L'Anniversaire (The Anniversary), 1972 (posthumous)
 La Cité des Roses (The City of Roses), 2008 (posthumous

External links 
 The Poor Man's Son

1913 births
1962 deaths
People from Aït Mahmoud
Kabyle people
Algerian writers
Berber writers
Algerian writers in French
Assassinated Algerian people